Young Black Teenagers (YBT) was an American hip hop group from Long Island, New York that consisted of ATA, First Born, Tommy Never, Kamron, and DJ Skribble. Despite their name, none of the group's members were black.

YBT had the support of the prominent rap group Public Enemy and their producer Hank Shocklee signed them as the first act of his label Sound of Urban Listeners (SOUL). They released their second album with MCA Records.

History 
Their debut album Young Black Teenagers (1991) featured the singles "Nobody Knows Kelli" (about the character Kelly Bundy from the sitcom Married... with Children), "Proud to Be Black", and "To My Donna" (an attack on Madonna for taking the rhythm track of the Public Enemy song "Security of the First World" for her single "Justify My Love").  After the first album, Tommy Never left the group, and YBT became a foursome, with A.T.A. contributing more vocally. Their second album, Dead Enz Kidz Doin' Lifetime Bidz (1993), featured the song "Tap the Bottle", their biggest single. The group broke up in 1994.

Young Black Teenagers were listed among VH1's "Least Hiphop Moments" for their name and premise.

Members

 Adam "Firstborn" Weiner – rap vocals, main artist, songwriter
 Ron "Kamron" Winge – rap vocals, main artist, songwriter
 Rodney "ATA" Rivera – rap vocals, main artist, songwriter
 Tommy Never – rap vocals, main artist, songwriter
 Scott "DJ Skribble" Ialacci – main artist, turntables, sampler

Discography

Studio albums

Singles

As lead artist

Promotional singles

References

American hip hop groups
East Coast hip hop groups